German submarine U-421 was a Type VIIC U-boat built for Nazi Germany's Kriegsmarine for service during World War II.
She was laid down on 20 January 1942 by Danziger Werft, Danzig as yard number 122, launched on 24 September 1942 and commissioned on 13 January 1943 under Oberleutnant zur See Hans Kolbus.

Design
German Type VIIC submarines were preceded by the shorter Type VIIB submarines. U-421 had a displacement of  when at the surface and  while submerged. She had two shafts and two  propellers.

U-421 was fitted with five  torpedo tubes (four fitted at the bow and one at the stern), fourteen torpedoes, one  SK C/35 naval gun, 220 rounds, and two twin  C/30 anti-aircraft guns. The boat had a complement of between forty-four and sixty.

Service history
The boat's career began with training at 8th U-boat Flotilla on 13 January 1943, followed by active service on 1 November 1943 as part of the 9th Flotilla. On 1 April 1944, she transferred to 29th Flotilla for operations in the Mediterranean for the remainder of her service. In two patrols she sank no ships.

Wolfpacks
U-421 took part in six wolfpacks, namely:
 Coronel (4 – 8 December 1943)
 Coronel 1 (8 – 14 December 1943)
 Coronel 2 (14 – 17 December 1943)
 Föhr (18 – 23 December 1943)
 Rügen 6 (23 – 26 December 1943)
 Hela (28 December 1943 – 1 January 1944)

Fate
U-421 was sunk on 29 April 1944 in the Mediterranean in position  at the military port of Toulon, France, in an air raid by US aircraft.

See also
 Mediterranean U-boat Campaign (World War II)

References

Bibliography

External links

German Type VIIC submarines
1942 ships
U-boats commissioned in 1943
U-boats sunk in 1944
U-boats sunk by US aircraft
World War II shipwrecks in the Mediterranean Sea
World War II submarines of Germany
Ships built in Danzig
Maritime incidents in April 1944